Reunited is an American sitcom that aired on UPN from October 27 until December 29, 1998. At the time, it was one of the lowest-rated programs ever tabulated, with an average 0.9 Nielsen rating, which meant only around 885,000 viewers watched it every week.

Premise
Nicki meets the daughter she gave up for adoption 20 years earlier.

Cast
Julie Hagerty as Nicki Beck
Cliff Bemis as Gary Beck
Kelly DeMartino as Joanne
Renee Olstead as Ami Beck
Jamie Marsh as Roy

Episodes

References

External links
 

1998 American television series debuts
1998 American television series endings
1990s American sitcoms
English-language television shows
UPN original programming
Television series by Warner Bros. Television Studios
Television shows set in Pittsburgh
Television series by Castle Rock Entertainment